Brendan Nana Akwasi Sarpong Wiredu (born 7 November 1999) is an English professional footballer who plays as a midfielder for Fleetwood Town.

Career

Charlton Athletic
Wiredu, who can play as a midfielder, full-back or wing-back, made his debut for Charlton Athletic on 14 August 2018, coming on as a substitute for Albie Morgan in a 3–0 EFL Trophy defeat to Milton Keynes Dons. On 1 May 2019, his contract was extended until 2021.

On 8 February 2019, he joined Bromley on loan until 9 March. His loan was later extended until the end of the season.

Wiredu then joined Colchester United on loan until January 2020. He returned to Charlton on 3 January 2020.

Colchester United
On 1 February 2021, Wiredu joined Colchester United on a permanent basis having previously spent time on loan with the club. He scored his first professional goal in Colchester's 2–2 draw with Tranmere Rovers on 23 March 2021.

On 5 July 2021, he signed a two-year contract extension with the club.

Fleetwood Town
On 21 June 2022, Wiredu joined Fleetwood Town on a three-year deal.

Personal life
Born in London, Wiredu is of Ghanaian descent. He attended St Saviours primary school in Poplar and Bishop Challoner Catholic Collegiate Secondary School in Shadwell.

Career statistics

References

1999 births
Living people
English footballers
English people of Ghanaian descent
Association football midfielders
Charlton Athletic F.C. players
Bromley F.C. players
Colchester United F.C. players
Fleetwood Town F.C. players
National League (English football) players
English Football League players
Black British sportspeople